Wagner da Silva (born 24 September 1989), known as Wagner Silva or simply Wagner, is a Brazilian footballer who plays as a centre back for Ríver Atlético Clube.

References

External links
Atlético Paranaense profile 

1989 births
Living people
Sportspeople from Rio Grande do Sul
Brazilian footballers
Brazilian expatriate footballers
Association football defenders
Campeonato Brasileiro Série B players
Campeonato Brasileiro Série C players
Campeonato Brasileiro Série D players
S.L. Benfica footballers
Sport Club Internacional players
Sport Club do Recife players
Esporte Clube Pelotas players
Centro Sportivo Alagoano players
Mogi Mirim Esporte Clube players
Club Athletico Paranaense players
Clube Atlético Linense players
Capivariano Futebol Clube players
Esporte Clube Cruzeiro players
Esporte Clube Novo Hamburgo players
Associação Atlética Aparecidense players
River Atlético Clube players
Brazilian expatriate sportspeople in Portugal
Expatriate footballers in Portugal